Sinfonia in D major, BWV 1045, sometimes referred to as a violin concerto movement (Konzertsatz), is an orchestral work for solo violin, three trumpets, timpani, two oboes, strings and continuo, written down by Johann Sebastian Bach. In particular, the piece ends abruptly, with the last two bars (151 and 152) appearing in someone else's hand and attached as a separate page at the end of the manuscript, which is otherwise in Bach's hand. The work features a highly virtuosic concertato part with extensive chordal and arpeggiated passages and at one point reaches a''', unusually high for Bach's violin music.

References

External links 
 Sinfonia in D major, BWV 1045: performance by the Netherlands Bach Society (video and background information)
 
 

Cantatas by Johann Sebastian Bach
Concertos by Johann Sebastian Bach
1744 compositions